Joseph de Sonay (born 6 December 1896, date of death unknown) was a Belgian diver. He competed in the men's plain high diving event at the 1920 Summer Olympics.

References

1896 births
Year of death missing
Belgian male divers
Olympic divers of Belgium
Divers at the 1920 Summer Olympics
Place of birth missing